— Edgar Allan Poe, The Raven

Nationality words link to articles with information on the nation's poetry or literature (for instance, Irish or France).

Events
 January 10—Robert Browning, 32, and Elizabeth Barrett, 38, begin their correspondence when she receives a note declaring "I love you" from Browning, a little-known poet whose verses she had praised in her poem "Lady Geraldine's Courtship"; on May 20 they meet for the first time. She begins writing her Sonnets from the Portuguese.
 April - Nathaniel Hawthorne first publishes "P.'s Correspondence", a short story and example of alternative history in which many poets and other writers and political figures who have died in real life (such as John Keats, Percy Shelley and Lord Byron) are described as still living, and vice versa. The story, which appears in The United States Magazine and Democratic Review, is later included in Hawthorne's Mosses from an Old Manse (1846).

Works published in English

United Kingdom
 W. E. Aytoun, writing under the pen name "Bon Gaultier", and Theodore Martin, The Book of Ballads, parodies
 Philip James Bailey, Festus (2nd, enlarged, edn, with authorship acknowledged)
 Bernard Barton, Household Verses
 Horatius Bonar, The Bible Hymn-Book
 Robert Browning, Dramatic Romances and Lyrics, (Volume 7 of Bells and Pomegranates) including "How They Brought the Good News from Ghent to Aix", "The Lost Leader", and "The Flight of the Duchess"; reprinted in Poems 1849; see also Bells and Pomegranates 1841, 1842, 1843, 1844, and 1846
 Thomas Cooper, The Purgatory of Suicides, written in Stafford Gaol
 Louisa Costello, editor, The Rose Garden of Persia, translations from Persian, anthology
 Frederick William Faber, The Rosary, and Other Poems
 George Gilfillan, A Gallery of Literary Portraits, first series, including biographical sketches of William Hazlitt, Percy Bysshe Shelley, Thomas Carlyle, Thomas De Quincey, Walter Savage Landor, Samuel Coleridge, William Wordsworth, Charles Lamb and Robert Southey; second series 1850, third series 1854
 Robert Southey, Oliver Newman: A New-England tale, unfinished, also includes other poems; published posthumously
 William Wordsworth, The Poems of William Wordsworth, Poet Laureate, has further revisions to poems and some published for the first time; see also Miscellaneous Poems 1820, Poetical Works 1827, Poetical Works 1857, and Poetical Works, Centenary Edition, 1870

United States
 Julia Abigail Fletcher Carney, "Little Things", first published in a Sunday school paper, Gospel Teacher (renamed, Myrtle)
 Thomas Holley Chivers, The Lost Pleiad, and Other Poems
 Rufus Wilmot Griswold, The Poets and Poetry of England, anthology
 Henry Beck Hirst, The Coming of the Mammoth
 George Moses Horton, The Poetical Works of George M. Horton, the Colored Bard of North Carolina, to which is Prefixed the Life of the Author, written by himself, published through a subscription; Horton, a slave, hoped to buy his freedom with earnings from his poetry, but was unsuccessful, and was finally freed in 1865 as a result of the Civil War, Hillsborough, North Carolina: Heart
 Henry Wadsworth Longfellow:
The Belfry of Bruges and Other Poems
 Editor, The Waif, anthology
 William Wilberforce Lord, Poems
 James Russell Lowell, "The Present Crisis"
 Edgar Allan Poe, The Raven and Other Poems, including "The Raven", a poem first published January 29 in the New York Evening Mirror
 William Gilmore Simms, Grouped Thoughts and Scattered Fancies, sonnets; Richmond
 Nathaniel Parker Willis, Poems, Sacred, Passionate, and Humorous

Works published in other languages
 Abraham Emanuel Fröhlich, Ulrich von Hutten, Switzerland
 François-Xavier Garneau, Histoire du Canada, Volume 1, covering the history of New France from its founding until 1701 (Volume 2 published in 1846, Volume 3 published in 1848; revised version in three volumes published in 1852), "a book which played a vital role in the emergence of a French Canadian literature, including poetry", according to The New Princeton Encyclopedia of Poetry and Poetics; Canada
 Théophile Gautier, Albertus, revised from the 1832 edition; poems in a wide variety of verse forms, often imitating other, more established Romantic poets such as Sainte-Beuve, Alphonse de Lamartine, and Victor Hugo (an expanded version of Poésies 1830, which contained 40 pieces composed when the author was 18 years old, and which went unsold during the upheaval of the July Revolution); includes "Albertus", written in 1831, a long narrative poem of 122 alexandrine stanzas parodying macabre and supernatural Romantic tales; France
 Heinrich Hoffmann (anonymously), Lustige Geschichten und drollige Bilder mit 15 schön kolorierten Tafeln für Kinder von 3–6 Jahren ("Funny Stories and Whimsical Pictures with 15 Beautifully Coloured Panels for Children Aged 3 to 6", later known as Struwwelpeter), German
 Christien Ostrowski, translator, Œuvres poétiques de Michiewicz ("Poetic Works of Mickiewicz"), translation into French from the original Polish of Adam Mickiewicz, Paris
 Sándor Petőfi, János Vitéz (John the Valiant) and Cipruslombok Etelke sírjára (Branches of Cypress for Etelke's Tomb), Hungary
 Zacharias Topelius, Ljungblommor ("Heather blossoms"), Volume I, Finland, Swedish language

Births
Death years link to the corresponding "[year] in poetry" article:
 February 19 – Kerala Varma Valiya Koil Thampuran, also known as Kerala Varma, (died 1914), Indian, Malayalam-language poet and translator; also wrote in Malayalam, English and Sanskrit
 March 22 – John Banister Tabb (died 1909), American poet, Catholic priest and professor of English
 April 24 – Carl Spitteler (died 1924), Swiss
 April 30 – Alexander Anderson (died 1909), Scots
 May 13 – Emily Manning (died 1890), Australian
 May 14 – Louisa Sarah Bevington (died 1895), English poet and anarchist
 May 17 – Jacint Verdaguer (died 1902), Spanish poet writing in Catalan
 July 18 – Tristan Corbière (died 1875), French
 July 26 – Martina Swafford (died 1913), American poet.
 August 10 – Abai Qunanbaiuly (died 1904), Kazakh poet, composer, philosopher and cultural reformer
 October 14 – Olindo Guerrini (died 1916), Italian
 October 21 – Will Carleton (died 1912), American
 December 30 – Thomas Edward Spencer (died 1910), Australian

Deaths
Birth years link to the corresponding "[year] in poetry" article:
 February 22 – Sydney Smith (born 1771), English writer
 May 3 – Thomas Hood (born 1799), English poet
 May 12 – János Batsányi (born 1763), Hungarian poet
 May 26 – Jónas Hallgrímsson (born 1807), Icelandic poet
 June 17 – Richard Harris Barham ('Thomas Ingoldsby') (born 1788), English comic poet
 July 26 – John McPherson (born 1817), Canadian poet
 November 11 – Maria Gowen Brooks (born c. 1794), American poet
 Jahonotin Uvaysiy (born 1780), Uzbek Sufi poet

See also

 19th century in poetry
 19th century in literature
 List of years in poetry
 List of years in literature
 Victorian literature
 French literature of the 19th century
 Biedermeier era of German literature
 Golden Age of Russian Poetry (1800–1850)
 Young Germany (Junges Deutschland) a loose group of German writers from about 1830 to 1850
 List of poets
 Poetry
 List of poetry awards

Notes

19th-century poetry

Poetry